The European Film Academy Lux Award is a prize given to a competing film by the European Parliament and the European Film Academy. It is one of the European Film Awards, which were established to recognize excellence in European cinematic achievements. Previously known as the People's Choice Award for Best European Film, it was first awarded in 1997 with Peter Cattaneo's film The Full Monty being the first recipient of the award. It was named Best European Director from 1998 to 2005. It changed to its current name in 2020, when the European Parliament became partly responsible for the management of the award, replacing the former Lux Prize.

The award is aimed at highlighting films which help to raise awareness of socio-political issues in Europe and to publicise and encourage distribution of European films in the European Union and throughout the world. As of the 2021 ceremony, Collective is the most recent winner.

Winners and nominees

1990s

2000s

2010s

2020s

See also
 Lux Prize

References

External links
 
 

Lux Award
Awards established in 1997
Awards for best film
Lists of films by award
Audience awards